Tyler Michael Ankrum (born March 6, 2001) is an American professional stock car racing driver. He competes full-time in the NASCAR Craftsman Truck Series, driving the No. 16 Toyota Tundra for Hattori Racing Enterprises. Ankrum won the 2018 NASCAR K&N Pro Series East championship, earning DGR-Crosley's first championship in any racing series. Ankrum is the first driver born in 2000 or later to win a NASCAR national series race.

Racing career
Growing up on the west coast of America, Ankrum started racing quarter midgets and later moved up to late models. He won his first late model race at Caraway Speedway at age 14. Ankrum continues to run super late model races around the country, winning Hickory Motor Speedway's Fall Brawl in 2015 and finishing third in the 2018 Rattler 250. He switched to the super late model in late 2015 after one year running the CARS Tour in the Late Model Stock division.

K&N Pro Series East

In January 2018, Ankrum signed with David Gilliland Racing for half of the 2018 NASCAR K&N Pro Series East season. By the third race of the season, one more race was added with the potential for more with additional funding; it eventually morphed into a full-time effort. He won his first race in his fourth start at South Boston Speedway in May over teammate Tyler Dippel, and almost won the other race in the doubleheader that day if not for a run-in with Chase Cabre late in the second race. Ankrum then went on a midsummer tear, winning three consecutive K&N East races, at Thompson Speedway after failing post-qualifying tech; going flag-to-flag the following week in a caution-free race at New Hampshire Motor Speedway, and winning a combination east–west race at Iowa Speedway, which he called "overwhelming". Despite only finishing 13th at the September New Hampshire race, Ankrum left the event with an insurmountable points lead, clinching him the 2018 K&N Pro Series East championship.

Craftsman Truck Series
After winning the K&N Pro Series East championship, Ankrum would make his Truck Series debut at Martinsville in the No. 54 Toyota Tundra for DGR-Crosley. Seth Smith, Ankrum's K&N crew chief, served as crew chief for the effort. After starting nineteenth, Ankrum finished eighteenth. Ankrum ran the following race with DGR, notching his first top-ten finish in sixth at ISM Raceway.

When asked in early November 2018 about 2019 plans, Ankrum noted that a lack of sponsorship would likely prevent him from running in the Truck Series full-time in 2019. He stated that his 2019 racing slate would include part-time rides in Trucks, the ARCA Racing Series and in super late model racing. However, on December 14, 2018, Ankrum and DGR-Crosley announced that he would run full-time in 2019 starting with the spring Martinsville race due to age restrictions. At Texas in June, Ankrum graduated high school on a stage during pre-race ceremonies and then recovered from multiple incidents during the race, including a slide down pit road, to finish a career-best third. On June 11, 2019, Ankrum announced that sponsorship woes had put him out of the truck, with only a handful of races left in the season. He would eventually land a start and park ride with NEMCO Motorsports for races not on his DGR-Crosley schedule, allowing him to remain eligible for the playoffs. On July 11, 2019, Ankrum scored his first Truck Series win at Kentucky after Brett Moffitt ran out of fuel towards the final lap. This also marked DGR-Crosley's first Truck Series win. The win qualified him for the playoffs, but he did not advance past the Round of 6.

On November 14, 2019, Ankrum joined GMS Racing for the 2020 Truck season.

In 2022, he will return to driving a Toyota team, this time the No. 16 for Hattori Racing Enterprises.

Personal life
When Ankrum was young, he dreamed of being a professional bull rider like his childhood hero, Lane Frost. After his mom Michelle quickly turned down the idea, Ankrum quickly transitioned to wanting to be a professional golfer, after his father, who also dabbled in racing. After growing up on a ranch in Southern California, Ankrum and his family moved to North Carolina for racing. He attended Lake Norman High School.

Motorsports career results

NASCAR
(key) (Bold – Pole position awarded by qualifying time. Italics – Pole position earned by points standings or practice time. * – Most laps led. ** – All laps led.)

Craftsman Truck Series

 Season still in progress
 Ineligible for series points

K&N Pro Series East

ARCA Menards Series
(key) (Bold – Pole position awarded by qualifying time. Italics – Pole position earned by points standings or practice time. * – Most laps led.)

References

External links
 
 

2001 births
Living people
NASCAR drivers
Racing drivers from California
Sportspeople from San Bernardino, California